Nanduri Sambasiva Rao IPS (Retd), (born 1957) served as an Indian Police Service officer (RR: 1984 Batch) from 19 December 1984 – 31 December 2017. He secured AIR ( All India Rank) of 136 in UPSC with Physics and Mechanical Engineering as major subjects. He served as the Director general of police (HoPF - Head of Police Force) of Andhra Pradesh.  Prior to DGP, he was vice-chairman, Managing Director of APSRTC where he was known for implementing revolutionary changes and improved customer service vastly. He was also the Director General of State Disaster Response and Fire Services in the undivided Andhra Pradesh from 2013 to 2015. He is widely known for his Project Management, Investigation Analysis and Motivational Talks. He was awarded Indian Police Medal in 2000, for his impeccable service in counter-insurgency (Antrik Suraksha Sevapathak) operations. In 2010, on the occasion of Republic day, he received the President Police Medal, for his distinguished service. He believes in "Continuous Improvement" and "Everyday Learning".

Personal life 
Sambasiva Rao was born on 13 December 1957, in Ongole, Prakasam District. He is the fourth and youngest child of Sri. Ramakotaiah Nanduri and Smt. Ansuyamma Nanduri. His father, who was a school teacher played an important role in his education. He studied at Municipal Elementary School, followed by high school education in PVR High School, Ongole, Prakasam District. Till date he has very high regards for his teachers Mr. Balakrishna Murthy, Mr. Ramakrishna and Mr. Uma Maheshwar Rao who created the zeal to excel in mathematics and physics. He completed his intermediate education from CSR Sharma College, Ongole. He was gold medalist in mechanical engineering from College of Engineering Andhra University, 1979. He later went on to pursue Masters in Technology in mechanical engineering and thermal sciences from IIT, Kanpur 1982. It was during this time when he started preparing for Union Public Service Commission Examination, where he secured an All India Rank of 136 in 1984 and subsequently allotted  Andhra Pradesh cadre. He married his childhood friend Uma Kumari Nanduri in the same year. He is blessed with two daughters.

Posting Particulars

Interests 
He is a voracious reader, plays tennis and likes gardening. He is a huge fan of Amitabh Bachchan, Rafael Nadal, Narendra Modi and Steve Jobs.

References 

Indian Police Service officers
1957 births
Living people
People from Ongole